Lezha, also known as Olidovka, is a river in Gryazovetsky, Vologodsky, and Mezhdurechensky Districts of Vologda Oblast in Russia. It is a right tributary of the Sukhona. The principal tributaries are the Senga (left), the Velikaya (right), and the Komela (left).

The river basin of the Lezha constitutes the southernmost part of the basin of the Northern Dvina and comprises the eastern part of Gryazoversky District, parts of Mezhdurechensky and Vologodsky Districts, and minor areas in the north of Kostroma Oblast. Areas east, south, and west of the Lezha river basin drain to the Volga. The basin of the Lezha includes Lake Nikolskoye, which drains into the Komela.

The source of the Lezha is in the south of Gryazoversky District, at the border with Kostroma Oblast. The river flows in the northwestern direction, crossing the district up to its northern border. The urban-type settlement of Vokhtoga is located on the right bank of the Lezha. The lowest stretch of the Lezha forms the border between Vologodsky and Mezhdurechensky Districts. The mouth of the Lezha is close to the mouth of the Vologda and to the village of Ustye Vologodskoye.

References

External links

Rivers of Vologda Oblast